Tellis Joseph Frank Jr. (born April 26, 1965) is an American former professional basketball player and former assistant coach for the Atlanta Dream of the Women's National Basketball Association (WNBA). At 6'8.5" (2.08 m) and 225 pounds (102 kg) he played as a power forward.

High school & college career
Frank is a 1983 graduate of Lew Wallace High School (Gary, Indiana).
He played college basketball for Western Kentucky from 1983 to 1987.  At Western Kentucky, Frank was a key player in the resurgence of the basketball program.  He led the team to its first Sun Belt Conference basketball championship, a top ten national ranking, a 2nd-place finish in the pre-season NIT, and back-to-back NCAA tournament appearances.

Professional career
Frank was selected by the Golden State Warriors in the first round (14th overall pick) of the 1987 NBA draft. He played for the Warriors (1987–1989), Miami Heat (1989–1990) and Minnesota Timberwolves (1991–1992, 1993–1994) during his five-year NBA career, averaging 6.5 points per game. He was briefly signed by Cleveland Cavaliers in 1995, but did not play in any NBA games for the club.

He also played in Italy, for Phonola Caserta (1990–1993, won the league in 1991), Scandone Avellino (Serie A2, 1998–1999), Basket Livorno (Serie A2, 1999–2000) and Longobardi Scafati (Serie A2, 2000–2001). He also played in the Spanish Liga ACB with three teams in as many years.

References

External links
 NBA playing history for Frank
 Serie A profile  Retrieved 11 August 2015

1965 births
Living people
20th-century African-American sportspeople
21st-century African-American people
African-American basketball players
American expatriate basketball people in France
American expatriate basketball people in Italy
American expatriate basketball people in Spain
American men's basketball players
American women's basketball coaches
Atlanta Dream coaches
Baloncesto León players
Basket Livorno players
Basketball coaches from Indiana
Basketball players from Gary, Indiana
Bàsquet Manresa players
Real Betis Baloncesto players
Cholet Basket players
Golden State Warriors draft picks
Golden State Warriors players
Juvecaserta Basket players
Lega Basket Serie A players
Liga ACB players
Miami Heat players
Minnesota Timberwolves players
Power forwards (basketball)
S.S. Felice Scandone players
Sportspeople from Gary, Indiana
Western Kentucky Hilltoppers basketball players